Fong Chi-keong (born 16 November 1947 in Macau) was a member of the Legislative Assembly of Macau and a businessman. Fong is known for criticism of the government and the New Macau Association. Fong Chi-keong often known as "Fong (Firing) Cannon" for his radical talking in AL.

Election results

References

1949 births
Living people
Cantonese people
Members of the Legislative Assembly of Macau
Macau politicians